Werner Huth (born 1905, date of death unknown) is a German bobsledder who competed in the early 1930s. He finished seventh in the two-man event at the 1932 Winter Olympics in Lake Placid, New York.

References
1932 bobsleigh two-man results
Werner Huth's profile at Sports Reference.com

1905 births
Olympic bobsledders of Germany
Bobsledders at the 1932 Winter Olympics
German male bobsledders
Year of death missing